Cabinet of Jerzy Buzek was appointed on 31 October 1997 and passed the vote of confidence on 11 November 1997.

The Cabinet

Buzek, Jerzy
Cabinet of Jerzy Buzek
1997 establishments in Poland
2001 disestablishments in Poland
Cabinets established in 1997
Cabinets disestablished in 2001